Pajarito Mountain Ski Area (Pajarito) is located on the north face of Pajarito Mountain, one of the Jemez Mountains in north central New Mexico, west of Los Alamos. Pajarito Mountain is owned and operated by volunteers and  Mountain Capital Partners. A typical season runs from Christmas to early April, but an outstanding season may run from Thanksgiving to late April. Pajarito now has a snowmaking system and it is producing snow. Season passes are available with discounts available for early season purchase.

In summer, Pajarito hosts numerous special events, many involving mountain biking. An extensive network of single and double track mountain bike trails criss-cross the mountain, including a new singletrack trail going to the summit. Pajarito hosts lift access downhill and freeride mountain biking off the Spruce chair, and has continued to do so after the Las Conchas Fire in 2011.  There also are hiking trails, and horse riding is permitted everywhere except on the mountain bike trails. Adjacent to Pajarito is a Los Alamos County campground, Camp May; Santa Fe National Forest; and Valles Caldera National Preserve.

Origin of the name 
Pajarito means "little bird" in Spanish and was first associated with the area by the archeologist Edgar Lee Hewett who was in turn inspired by Tsirege, which means "bird place" in the Tewa language.  Tsirege is a prominent archaeological site located on property owned by Los Alamos National Laboratory.

History 
Pajarito Mountain first opened on 23 November 1957 with no toilets, no water, no grooming, no modern lifts and a few short slopes. The Aspen run received a T-bar for the 1962-1963 season. An additional  of land was purchased in the late 1960s and the first chairlift installed on the Spruce run for the 1969-1970 season. A similar two person chairlift was installed on the Big Mother run for the 1976-1977 season. A beginners lift was installed, to replace a rope tow, for the 1981-1982 season, and a triple chairlift replaced the T-bar for the following 1982-1983 season. Construction of the new Ski Lodge began in the summer of 1987 and was finished for the 1988-1989 season. A quad chairlift was completed in 1994 for the Townsight run.

In the summer of 2011, the Las Conchas Fire burned a portion of the ski area. The fire burned ten of the mountain's 44 runs, and damaged two chairlifts. The most significant damage occurred on the mountain's east side, in the Townsight area. Despite fire damage, Pajarito Mountain opened for the 2011-2012 season with four lifts operating and 34 runs open.

Elevation
Base: . / 2,743 m
Lodge elevation: . / 2,804 m
Summit: . / 3,182 m
Vertical Rise: . / 439 m

Trails
Skiable Area: 
Trails: 44 total (20% beginner, 50% intermediate, 30% advanced/expert)

Lifts

1 quad chair lift
1 triple chair lift
3 double chair lifts
1 surface lift (Magic Carpet)

Facilities
 Equipment Rental
 Retail 
 Cafe 
 Snowsports School
 Ski Patrol: Volunteer, NSP affiliated

External links
 Pajarito Mountain Ski Area
 Pajarito Winter Mountain Trail Map
 Pajarito Summer Mountain Trail Map
 Pajarito Park
 Pajarito Ski Area Pictures
 Pajarito by Twintip nation on YouTube

Jemez Mountains
Ski areas and resorts in New Mexico
Buildings and structures in Los Alamos County, New Mexico
Mountain biking venues in the United States
Tourist attractions in Los Alamos County, New Mexico
1957 establishments in New Mexico